Shijan (also Romanized as Shījān and Sheyjān; also known as Sheykhān, Shezhān, and Shidzhan) is a village in Chapar Khaneh Rural District, Khomam District, Rasht County, Gilan Province, Iran. At the 2006 census, its population was 1,223, in 386 families.

References 

Populated places in Rasht County